The Batiste family of New Orleans includes twenty-five or more musicians, including

Harold Battiste (1931–2015), composer and arranger
Alvin Batiste (1932–2007), American jazz clarinetist
Jon Batiste (born 1986), American jazz pianist
Lionel Batiste (1931–2012), American jazz musician
Russell Batiste Jr. (born 1965), American drummer

Jean Batiste was born in Metairie, Louisiana, and moved to New York City, where he met Estella. Jean and Estelle moved to New Orleans and were owners of a grocery store and a hardware store in the 9th Ward of New Orleans. Their grandchildren include Jon Batiste (born 1986), American jazz pianist, and Russell Batiste Jr. (born 1965), American drummer. Other family members include Lionel Batiste of the Treme Brass Band, Milton Batiste of the Olympia Brass Band, and composer and arranger Harold Battiste.

See also
 Batiste (disambiguation)
 Batista

References

American musical families
African-American families